Ibrahim Anyars Tanko (born 25 July 1977) is a Ghanaian retired footballer who played mostly as a second striker or an attacking midfielder, scout and manager who last served as the head coach of the local Black Stars - Ghana A' national football team.

He played most of his 15-year professional career – blighted by injuries – in Germany, with Borussia Dortmund and Freiburg. At the international level, he represented the Ghana national football team.

Club career

Borussia Dortmund 
Born in Kumasi, Tanko signed with German side Borussia Dortmund from King Faisal Babes F.C. at age 17, making him the third youngest player to appear professionally for them behind Nuri Şahin and Lars Ricken. He made his Bundesliga debut on 24 September 1994 in a 5–0 home win against VfB Stuttgart, and finished his first season with 14 games and one goal.

Tanko participated in three matches, all as a late substitute, in Borussia's 1996–97 UEFA Champions League victorious run. Injuries and loss of form led to an eventual demotion to the Borussia Dortmund II where he played 24 league matches from 1998 to 2000.

He made another 13 league appearances before leaving the club in 2001. He was also suspended and eventually released after testing positive for cannabis. During his seven-year period with the club, he made 71 appearances in all competitions for the first team and scored three goals.

SC Freiburg 
In January 2001, Tanko joined SC Freiburg, scoring in his fourth game to help to a 3–1 success at VfL Bochum, but also missed a great part of the following campaign due to a severe knee injury, as the Black Forest team dropped down to the 2. Bundesliga.

At Freiburg, Tanko's output improved slightly, and he played a career-high 27 matches (with two goals) in 2005–06 2. Bundesliga. However, he only appeared once the following season, and retired at 30.

International career
Tanko earned nine caps for Ghana, the last coming on 10 October 2004 – after an absence of eight years – in a 2006 FIFA World Cup qualifier against the Democratic Republic of Congo.

Coaching career 
On 1 July 2007, Tanko was named assistant coach for Freiburg's reserves, leaving after 18 months together with Karsten Neitzel to J1 League's Urawa Red Diamonds, and re-uniting with former Freiburg boss Volker Finke in the same capacity. In the 2011 summer, he began working under Ståle Solbakken at 1. FC Köln. On 4 June 2013, Tanko resumed his partnership with Finke as the former joined the latter's coaching staff in the Cameroon national side.  In January 2012 he was appointed as the Ghana national team's head scout, prior to that year's Africa Cup of Nations.

In May 2017, Tanko was appointed as the first assistant coach for the Ghana national team to James Kwesi Appiah. After serving in that role two years, he was promoted to serve as the head coach of the Ghana national U-23, the Black Meteors in November 2018 after Yussif Abubakar died. He led the team to the Africa U-23 Cup of Nations tournament, Egypt 2019, for the first time in 12 years. The team missed out on qualifying for the 2020 Tokyo Olympics after losing on penalty shout out to South Africa. In January 2020, Tanko was appointed as the head coach of the Ghana A' national football team, the local Black Stars. After 5 months in charge of the team, he was replaced by Annor Walker.

On Tuesday, 28 June 2022, Tanko was appointed the Head coach of the Black Meteors by the Executive Council of the Ghana Football Association.

Personal life 
Tanko is married with three children. He is a devout Muslim and speaks French, English and German.

Honours 
Borussia Dortmund

 Bundesliga: 1994–95, 1995–96
UEFA Champions League: 1996–97

See also
List of doping cases in sport

References

External links

1977 births
Living people
Footballers from Kumasi
Ghanaian footballers
Association football forwards
King Faisal Babes FC players
Bundesliga players
2. Bundesliga players
Borussia Dortmund players
Borussia Dortmund II players
SC Freiburg players
Ghana international footballers
1996 African Cup of Nations players
Ghanaian expatriate footballers
Expatriate footballers in Germany
Ghanaian expatriate sportspeople in Germany
Doping cases in association football